The Marcel Claret Trophy has been awarded to the most sportsmanlike team in the Ligue Magnus since 1981.  The team with the fewest penalties during the regular season wins the trophy.

Winners

 1980–81 : Villard-de-Lans
 1981–82 : Lyon
 1982–83 : Briançon
 1983–84 : Briançon
 1984–85 : Villard-de-Lans
 1985–86 : Villard-de-Lans
 1986–87 : Mont-Blanc
 1987–88 : Mont Blanc
 1988–89 : Mont Blanc
 1989–90 : Caen
 1990–91 : Amiens
 1991–92 : Viry
 1992–93 : Rouen
 1993–94 : Rouen
 1994–95 : Rouen
 1995–96 : Amiens
 1996–97 : Amiens
 1997–98 : Viry
 1998–99 : Not awarded
 1999–00 : Amiens
 2000–01 : Rouen
 2001–02 : Amiens
 2002–03 : Dijon
 2003–04 : Villard-de-Lans
 2004–05 : Villard-de-Lans
 2005–06 : Chamonix
 2006–07 : Chamonix
 2007–08 : Villard-de-Lans
 2008–09 : Épinal
 2009–10 : Briançon
 2010–11 : Briançon
 2011–12 : Gap
 2012–13 : Gap
 2013–14 : Dijon
 2014–15 : Gap
 2015–16 : Chamonix
 2016–17 : Nice

External links
 Fédération Française de Hockey sur Glace

Awards established in 1981
Ligue Magnus
Ice hockey trophies and awards
French ice hockey trophies and awards
Sportsmanship trophies and awards